The 1888 Barcelona Universal Exposition (in Catalan: Exposició Universal de Barcelona and Exposición Universal de Barcelona in Spanish) was Spain's first International World's Fair and ran from 8 April to 9 December 1888. It was also the first of the two held in Barcelona (the second one being in 1929).

Summary

Eugenio Serrano de Casanova (journalist, writer and entrepreneur) tried to launch an exposition in 1886, and when that failed, the Mayor of Barcelona, Francesc Rius i Taulet, took over the planning of the project. The fair was hosted on the reconstructed  site of the city's main public park, the Parc de la Ciutadella, with Vilaseca's Arc de Triomf forming the entrance. More than 2 million people from Spain, the rest of Europe, and other international points of embarkation visited the exhibition, which made the equivalent of 1,737,000 United States dollars. The fair was opened by Alfonso XIII of Spain and Maria Christina of Austria. Twenty-seven countries participated, including China, Japan and the United States.

Contents
The piano manufacturer Erard sponsored a series of 20 concerts featuring Isaac Albéniz, a Catalan pianist and composer best known for his piano works based on folk music idioms. The artistic director was Tomàs Moragas.

Josep Maria Tamburini won a silver medal at the exhibition.

Legacy and surviving monuments
The main legacy of the 1888 World Fair is the Ciutadella Park: the World Fair served as the opportunity for Barcelona to rid itself of the hated citadel and transform it into a central park for the city's denizens. The entire Ciutadella Park in its present layout is a product of the World Fair, with its monumental fountain and small ponds, its Castell dels tres dracs (Castle of the Three Dragons) built by Domènech i Montaner to house the World Fair's café / restaurant, which later served to house the Zoology Museum, Hivernacle (Glasshouse or Greenhouse), the classicist Geology Museum and the Umbracle (a remarkable shaded structure for plants). 

Another product of the World Fair is the Modernista or Neo-Mudéjar Arc de Triomf (triumphal arch), the Fair's former gateway, presiding over Passeig de Lluís Companys.

The Columbus Monument (Monument a Colom), a 60 m (197 ft) tall monument to Christopher Columbus, was built for the exposition on the site where Columbus returned to Europe after his first voyage to the Americas. It was erected at the lower end of Les Rambles and remains standing today.

See also
1929 Barcelona International Exposition
1992 Summer Olympics
2004 Universal Forum of Cultures
L'Esquella de la Torratxa

 Urban planning of Barcelona

References

External links 

Official website of the BIE
THE WORLD’S FAIR 1888
 Overview / brief history of the 1888 Barcelona Universal Expo on the GenCat website (in English, Catalan, Occitan, Spanish and French).

World's fairs in Barcelona
History of Barcelona
Culture in Barcelona
Cultural infrastructure completed in 1888
Art Nouveau exhibitions
Modernisme architecture in Barcelona
19th century in Barcelona
Festivals established in 1888